The Studebaker Electric was an automobile produced by the Studebaker Brothers Manufacturing Company of South Bend, Indiana, a forerunner of the Studebaker Corporation.  The battery-powered cars were sold from 1902 to 1912.

Studebaker entered into the automobile manufacturing field in 1898 when Frederick S. Fish, as chairman of the executive committee, persuaded the board to supply $4,000, or $ today, for the development of an electric vehicle.  However, lacking the board’s full support, the project yielded one car.  The company did, however, enter into the field of producing bodies for electric taxis through Albert Augustus Pope’s Electric Vehicle Company.

Studebaker formally began production in earnest in 1902, and the company chose battery-powered electric vehicles because they were clean, easily recharged, and worked well in urban centers without need of refueling depots (gas stations). 

Studebaker Electrics were available in a variety of body styles, many of which mimicked the bodies that it had long produced for its lucrative passenger carriage line.  These included the Stanhope, Victoria, and Surrey. A four-passenger model was introduced in 1904. 

Fish realized early on that Studebaker’s future did not rest in the limited electric car, but in the gasoline-powered automobile.  Studebaker’s field of expertise was in body building and product distribution, not engine building.  This realization led to the creation of the Studebaker-Garford automobile in 1904.  The joint agreement worked well until 1909-1910 when Garford attempted to divert chassis to its own brand of automobile, and Studebaker, looking for an affordable car to sell entered into an agreement with the E-M-F Company of Detroit.  E-M-F would build the entire car, which would then be distributed through Studebaker wagon dealers.

Still, Studebaker continued to build electric vehicles until Fish decided to begin the process of seizing control of E-M-F in 1909, which Studebaker completed by 1910.

By 1912, it became conventional wisdom that the future lay in gasoline-powered engines rather than heavy, sluggish electrics, and the limited production of electric cars stopped.  An official announcement from the newly re-incorporated Studebaker Corporation stated:
The production of electric automobiles at South Bend has ended. . . It has been conducted for nine years without much success, and ultimately the superiority of the gasoline car (is) apparent.

See also
 Studebaker
 Studebaker National Museum

References

Electric
First car made by manufacturer
Battery electric vehicles